James Rider (March 5, 1797 Springfield, Queens County, New York – April 30, 1876 Jamaica, Queens Co., NY) was an American politician from New York.

Life
He was the son of John Rider (ca. 1766–1846) and Antje (Van Nostrand) Rider (b. 1765). On November 17, 1818, he married Margaret Rhodes.

He was Treasurer of the Merrick and Jamaica Plank Road Company from 1852 to 1854.

He was a member of the New York State Assembly (Queens Co.) in 1855.

He was a Republican member of the New York State Senate (1st D.) in 1856 and 1857.

He was buried at the Prospect Cemetery in Jamaica, Queens.

Sources
The New York Civil List compiled by Franklin Benjamin Hough (pages 137, 144, 249 and 299; Weed, Parsons and Co., 1858)
OBITUARY; JAMES RIDER in NYT on May 1, 1876
"James Ryder" at Long Island Surnames
Merrick and Jamaica Plank Road Collection at Stony Brook University

External links

1797 births
1876 deaths
Republican Party members of the New York State Assembly
Republican Party New York (state) state senators
People from Jamaica, Queens
19th-century American politicians